Ross Ernest Kite (1930–2004) was an Australian rugby league footballer who played in the 1950s. He was a premiership winning goal-kicking, winger with the St George Dragons, made state representative appearances and played in Test matches for the Australian national side.

Club career
He played six seasons for the St George Dragons between 1952–1957. He played in two Grand Finals during this time, losing in 1953 and winning a premiership in season 1956.

Kite moved to Wagga Wagga in 1958 for one season in Group 9 before returning to Sydney football in 1959 for Canterbury-Bankstown where he stayed until he retired at the end of the 1961 NSWRFL season.

Representative career
Kite's representative career began in 1954 when he was selected to play for New South Wales, in which he scored four tries in his debut match. He played for the Blues on eight occasions during his career in 1954, 1955, 1956 and 1958 and scored 14 tries during these appearances. In 1955 Kite made his debut at international level, when he was selected for Australian in all three Test matches against the touring French team. He made two more Test appearances in 1958 when he was selected to play against the touring English team. Ross Kite is listed on the Australian Players Register as Kangaroo No. 316.

Death

Kite died on 30 May 2004, age 73.

References

St. George Dragons players
Australia national rugby league team players
New South Wales rugby league team players
City New South Wales rugby league team players
Country New South Wales rugby league team players
Canterbury-Bankstown Bulldogs players
1931 births
2004 deaths
Rugby league wingers